Kshudhita Pashan is a Bengali drama film directed by Tapan Sinha and produced by Hemen Ganguly based on an 1895 short story of Rabindranath Tagore in the same name (Eng: "Hungry Stones"). This film was released in 1960 and received National Film Award for Second Best Feature Film. Music direction was done by Ustad Ali Akbar Khan.

Plot
A young tax collector is posted to a small town. He starts to reside in an abandoned old palace which is rumoured to be haunted. Local people try to warn him that whoever has attempted to stay there has either gone mad or died because the stones of the building are hungry. He realizes that a mysterious beautiful lady roams around the building at night.

Cast
 Soumitra Chatterjee
 Chhabi Biswas
 Arundhati Devi
 Dilip Roy
 Padma Devi
 Robin Banerjee
 Radhamohan Bhattacharya
 Arun Mukherjee

References

External links
 

1960 films
Bengali-language Indian films
Films based on short fiction
Films directed by Tapan Sinha
Films based on works by Rabindranath Tagore
Second Best Feature Film National Film Award winners
1960s Bengali-language films
Indian drama films
1960 drama films